The heliosphere is the bubble-like region of space dominated by the Sun, which extends far beyond the orbit of Pluto..

Heliosphere may also refer to:

Science fiction conventions 
Heliosphere (Science Fiction Convention)